Göttlesbrunn-Arbesthal is a town in the district of Bruck an der Leitha in Lower Austria in Austria.

Population

References

Cities and towns in Bruck an der Leitha District